Marvin Senger (born 6 January 2000) is a German professional footballer who plays as a defender for MSV Duisburg.

Career
Senger made his professional debut for FC St. Pauli in the 2. Bundesliga on 5 June 2020, starting in the away match against VfL Bochum.

On 1 February 2021, the last day of the 2020–21 winter transfer window,, he moved to 3. Liga club 1. FC Kaiserslautern on loan for the rest of the season.

On 24 June 2022, Senger signed a two-year contract with MSV Duisburg.

Career statistics

References

External links

2000 births
Living people
People from Henstedt-Ulzburg
Footballers from Schleswig-Holstein
German footballers
Association football defenders
FC St. Pauli II players
FC St. Pauli players
1. FC Kaiserslautern players
1. FC Kaiserslautern II players
MSV Duisburg players
2. Bundesliga players
3. Liga players
Regionalliga players
Oberliga (football) players
21st-century German people